The Chochilia, are a kind of a Greek traditional auxiliary percussion instrument. They are shells from the sea, which become auxiliary musical instruments with the appropriate processing. Each chochilia has its own musical tone. Those small shells also called ostraka are plentiful in Greek islands.

See also
Greek musical instruments
Greek folk music

References
The chochilia

Greek musical instruments
European percussion instruments